Apatelodes lacetania is a moth in the family Apatelodidae. It is found in Mexico.

References

Apatelodidae
Moths described in 1898